Victorinox is a knife manufacturer and watchmaker based in the town of Ibach, in the Canton of Schwyz, Switzerland. It is well known for its Swiss Army knives. The Swiss Army knives made by Victorinox are made of a proprietary blend hardened steel from Germany and France. Since its acquisition of rival Wenger in 2005, it has become the sole supplier of multi-purpose knives to the Swiss army. It is the biggest manufacturer of pocket knives in the world; in addition, the company licenses its logo for watches, apparel, and travel gear.

History

Founding 
 
The company was founded in 1884 as Messerfabrik Carl Elsener, the workshop of Karl Elsener in Ibach. Elsener, in 1891 co-founded Schweizerischer Messerschmiedverband, an association of Swiss knife manufacturers. Elsener and his colleagues from this time delivered knives to the Swiss army. In 1892, most of Elsener's colleagues left the enterprise, as it became apparent that Solingen manufacturers could deliver at a lower price. Elsener persisted in competing with Solingen, incurring severe financial losses.

Elsener's Schweizer Offiziers- und Sportmesser was patented in 1897, later marketed internationally as the Original Swiss Army Knife. This knife was not adopted by the Swiss Armed Forces as ordnance, but its commercial success allowed the company to recover financially.

On the death of his mother in 1909, Elsener named the brand "Victoria" in her honour. The introduction of the Swiss coat of arms as company logo dates to the same year.
In 1921, the company changed its trade name to the present "Victorinox", a portmanteau of "Victoria" and "inox", an abbreviation for acier inoxydable, the French term for stainless steel. Its legal name was officially changed in 1979.

Original versus Genuine 
During 1908 to 2005, the delivery of knives to the Swiss Armed Forces was shared with Wenger. A compromise between the two companies stated that Victorinox would market their knives as the "Original Swiss Army Knives", while Wenger would market theirs as "Genuine Swiss Army Knives". Wenger was acquired by Victorinox in 2005. Knives actually made for the army (as opposed to the generic "Swiss Army" trademark) are known as Soldatenmesser ("soldier knives"). These were produced in five generations, known by the date of their introduction as models 1890, 1908, 1951, 1961 and "08" (with minor variants within each generation). Model 1890 was originally produced by  Wester & Co, Solingen, and produced by Elsenser in competition with the Solingen manufacturer. Models 1908 and 1951 were also produced by several companies in Germany and Switzerland. Model 1961 was produced exclusively by Victorinox and Wenger, and Model 08, introduced after the acquisition of Wenger, is exclusively manufactured by Victorinox.

Swiss Army Issued Knives 1890–2008 
As issued by the Swiss Army.

Victorinox in North America 
In 1972, the Forschner Butcher Scale Company of New Britain, Connecticut became the exclusive Victorinox distributor for the United States. In 1981, the company went public and Charles Elsener, president of Victorinox, acquired a significant percentage of its shares. In 1983, it was renamed the Forschner Group, Inc. In the 1980s, Forschner registered the Swiss Army name as a trademark in the USA. In 1992, Precise Imports Corp., U.S. and Canadian importer of Wenger knives, sued and Forschner retained the rights to use the trademark on its compasses, timepieces, and sunglasses, while Precise could use it in marketing other non-knife items. In the mid-1990s, Forschner changed its name to Swiss Army Brands, Inc. (SABI).

In 2001, Victorinox teamed up with SABI to create an international watch company Victorinox Swiss Army Watch AG. In August 2002, Victorinox acquired all remaining shares of SABI to gain control of the Swiss Army trademark. Previously, SABI had sold the Swiss Army branded watch in North America and - under the license - the Victorinox branded watch outside North America. But afterwards, the combined Victorinox Swiss Army brand has been marketed worldwide.

Wenger acquisition 
On 26 April 2005 Victorinox acquired Wenger, the other official supplier of the Swiss Army knife, announcing that it intended to keep both brands intact.

In 2006 the company had a workforce of 900 employees. Its daily output was about 34,000 Swiss Army knives, 38,000 multi-tools, and 30,000 household, kitchen, and knives. Approximately 90% of its production is exported,to more than 100 countries. Victorinox has claimed never to have had to lay off an employee. To avoid this they set aside profits during boom periods to supplement recessionary periods, as well as temporarily contracting employees to other companies as outsourced labour during recessions.

On 30 January 2013 Victorinox announced that the company will merge Wenger's knife product lines with the Victorinox brand to strengthen its competitive position internationally.

Bushcraft usage 
The Farmer model was adopted by the Bushcraft community as their iconic folding knife. (circa 2005)

Luggage and clothing 
In 2014, Victorinox acquired the TRG Group from Centric Group. For several years, TRG Group was the Victorinox licensee for the manufacturing of luggage and travel oriented products. Victorinox integrated TRG Group in the company as the Victorinox Travel Gear division.

In 2017 Victorinox decided to close the apparel division with the purpose of focusing in other core product lines.

Products

Swiss Army knives 

The Swiss Army knife is the best-known product by Victorinox. Originally the sole supplier, Victorinox has shared the contract with Wenger since 1908. A compromise between the two companies gave Victorinox the right to advertise as the Original Swiss Army Knife, while Wenger laid claim to the title of Genuine Swiss Army Knife. Victorinox took over Wenger in 2005.

Swiss Army knives are widely used outside the army (and civil sales represent most of the turnover). They are multi-functional tools, and many sizes and functional combinations are produced. NASA astronauts have a Victorinox knife as standard equipment. Victorinox knives have also been taken to Mount Everest and the Arctic. The "Champion", Victorinox's model flagship prior to the introduction of the "SwissChamp" in 1986, is in the New York Museum of Modern Art's Permanent Design Collection.

SwissCard 
The SwissCard is roughly the size of a business card, typically with a small pair of scissors, a short non-folding knife, a small file with a screwdriver point, a plastic toothpick, tweezers, a slim ballpoint pen, and a straight pin, housed in a hard plastic case of 82 × 54.5 x 4.5 mm in size, with an inch ruler on one side and metric measurements on the other. Victorinox produces three types of SwissCards, the Classic, the Quattro and the Lite model. All three models differ in the number of functions they provide, ranging from 10 (Classic) to 13 functions (Quattro and Lite).

Cutlery 
Victorinox has long produced other kitchen cutlery under their own name and the Forschner brand name. In 2011 Victorinox stopped using the Forschner name and produces the same knives with the Victorinox name.

Professional knives 
Victorinox make a range of household and professional (NSF certified) food preparation knives. They offer chef's knives, bread, carving, filleting, deboning, paring, and specialized knives such as a cheese knife. Victorinox models are made with molded plastic handles, wooden handles or riveted handles. Most models are stamped blades, but one series has a forged bolster. They also have no ricasso – the flat section of the blade located at the junction of the blade and the heel.
Most models use stainless steel blades. One type is available with ceramic blades.

Bayonets 
Victorinox also produces the Sturmgewehr 90 bayonet for the Swiss Sturmgewehr 90 assault rifle. The bayonet has an overall length of 310 mm and a muzzle ring diameter of 22 mm. The 177 mm long blade is single-edged and it has no fuller. The bayonets were manufactured exclusively for the Swiss Army by both Wenger and Victorinox before the two companies merged.

Timepieces
In 1989 Victorinox entered the timepiece business in the United States under the brand name "Swiss Army".

Victorinox has various collections of watches which range from luxury dress watches to rugged dive watches. They feature mechanical and quartz movements. Collections include Infantry, Divemaster, Airboss, I.N.O.X. The timepieces are produced in Switzerland.

In 2014, Victorinox introduced the I.N.O.X. range of watches which it claims are resistant to high levels of shock, including being run over by a tank.

Other 
Victorinox produced a fashion line since the late 1990s, but retired from this project in 2017.

In 2012, Victorinox  licensed its name to luggage manufacturer TRG Accessories to produce branded travel gear and business accessories. Victorinox acquired TRG Accessories from Centric Group in 2014.

A number of Emissive Energy Corps products have been redesigned and rebranded as Victorinox LED flashlights. Most are available with a knurled aluminium body, similar to Swiss Army knives. Similarly, SwissTools are Victorinox's multi-tools, i.e. a pair of pliers with other tools folded into the grips. In 2018, Victorinox marketed a perfume under the name "Swiss Army", and registered "Swiss Army" and "Swiss Military" as  trademarks under US law. In October 2018, the Swiss Federal Office for Defence Procurement (Armasuisse) sued Victorinox, demanding the retirement of these trademarks. The context of the lawsuit is a 2012 parliamentary motion by state councillor Thomas Minder requesting the active protection of trademarks such as "Swiss Army", "Swiss Military" or "Swiss Air Force" on the part of the federal authorities. Victorinox argued that it does own the (English-language) trademarks "Swiss Army" and "Swiss Military".

Gallery

See also 

 Gerber multitool
 Leatherman
 Swiss made
 Wenger

References

External links

 Official website
 SAKWiki

 
Swiss companies established in 1884
Manufacturing companies established in 1884
Kitchen knife brands
Knife manufacturing companies
Manufacturing companies of Switzerland
Multi-tool manufacturers
Schwyz
Swiss watch brands
Watch manufacturing companies of Switzerland
Tool manufacturing companies of Switzerland